Performance Bikes, often known by the shortened form of "PB", was a monthly British motorcycling magazine which evolved during the 1980s from the long-running Motorcycle Mechanics. The first issue dated April 1985 and entitled Performance Bikes & Mechanics published by EMAP also incorporated the previous version of the title Mechanics and The Biker.

The magazine featured a mix of motorcycle and product tests, with technical articles and design innovation.

In 2007, PB under publisher Bauer moved testing of many of the motorcycles to the Nürburgring, in the Eifel Mountains of Germany. Where the Nordschleife fastest lap times are captured and collated into a table. This feature is called the PBTT, which stands for Performance Bikes Test Track.

PB is notable for its long association with the late journalist John Robinson (who had been with the magazine since its Motorcycle Mechanics days until his death in 2001). Robinson was key to PB pioneering the use of a dynamometer in the performance testing of motorcycles by a magazine.

Performance Bike was amalgamated with another Bauer magazine and continues under the name Practical Sportsbikes.

References

External links
 Archived Performance Bikes website

Bauer Group (UK)
Monthly magazines published in the United Kingdom
Motorcycle magazines published in the United Kingdom
Magazines established in 1985
Mass media in Peterborough
1985 establishments in the United Kingdom